USS LST-926 was an  in the United States Navy. Like many of her class, she was not named and is properly referred to by her hull designation.

Construction
LST-926 was laid down on 13 May 1944, at Hingham, Massachusetts, by the Bethlehem-Hingham Shipyard; launched on 24 June 1944; and commissioned on 20 July 1944..

Service history
During World War II, LST-926 was assigned to the Asiatic-Pacific theater. She took part in the Lingayen Gulf landings in January 1945, and the assault and occupation of Okinawa Gunto in April and June 1945.

The morning after the Japanese surrender on 15 August, the ship's crewmen found the cockpit of a Yokosuka D4Y aircraft that had launched an unsuccessful kamikaze attack. It is speculated that Japanese Admiral Matome Ugaki was one of the three bodies inside. All three were buried on a nearby beach.

After the war, she performed occupation duty in the Far East until late March 1946. The ship was decommissioned on 14 June 1946, and struck from the Navy list on 31 July, that same year. On 13 June 1948, the tank landing ship was sold to the Walter W. Johnson Co., for scrapping.

Awards
LST-926 earned two battle star for World War II service.

References

Bibliography

External links
 

LST-542-class tank landing ships
World War II amphibious warfare vessels of the United States
Ships built in Hingham, Massachusetts
1944 ships